Chul may refer to:

Chul, Khuzestan
Chul, Ramshir, Khuzestan Province
Chul, Lorestan
Chul (Korean name)